Lim Teck Pan (1938 – 1970s) was a Singaporean water polo player. He competed in the men's tournament at the 1956 Summer Olympics.

References

External links
 
 

1938 births
1970s deaths
Singaporean male water polo players
Olympic water polo players of Singapore
Water polo players at the 1956 Summer Olympics
Place of birth missing
Asian Games medalists in water polo
Asian Games bronze medalists for Singapore
Water polo players at the 1962 Asian Games
Medalists at the 1962 Asian Games
20th-century Singaporean people